María Jimena Cedrés Lobbosco (born 30 April 1992) is an Argentine field hockey player. At the 2014 Champions Trophy she won her first gold medal with the Argentina national team in an international tournament. Jimena also won the 2014–2015 World League and the 2016 Champions Trophy.

References

External links 
 

Living people
Las Leonas players
Argentine female field hockey players
1993 births
Field hockey players at the 2015 Pan American Games
Field hockey players from Buenos Aires
Field hockey players at the 2010 Summer Youth Olympics
Pan American Games silver medalists for Argentina
Pan American Games medalists in field hockey
South American Games gold medalists for Argentina
South American Games medalists in field hockey
Competitors at the 2014 South American Games
Medalists at the 2015 Pan American Games
21st-century Argentine women